Blast chilling is a method of cooling food quickly to a low temperature that is relatively safe from bacterial growth. Bacteria multiply fastest between +8 °C (46 °F) and +68 °C (154 °F). By reducing the temperature of cooked food from +70 °C (158 °F) to +3 °C (37 °F) or below within 90 minutes, the food is rendered safe for storage and later consumption. This method of preserving food is commonly used in food catering and, recently, in the preparation of "instant" foods, as it ensures the safety and the quality of the food product.

The blast chiller is a cousin of the refrigerator, another appliance designed to store food between +3 °C and +5 °C, but the blast chiller is a higher grade and more expensive appliance and is usually only found in commercial kitchens. As of 2013, in the UK, blast chillers are typically priced from GBP 2,000 to GBP 8,000 excluding VAT.

Use of blast chillers is prescribed for the restaurants of the European Union, e.g. in the regulations 852/2004 or 853/2004.

See also
 Flash freezing
 Snap freezing
 Food storage
 Food preservation
 Pumpable ice technology

References

Food preservation
Heating, ventilation, and air conditioning